A wildfeed is an unannounced transmission of a television program via C band or Ku band satellite. These programs include sporting events, news, and syndicated shows and are often unedited.

They exist to allow network television stations to send content to smaller local stations. The shows contain no commercials, just a small gap of blank video to allow the local station to insert their own. The exception for this is for "barter" syndicated programming, where only the commercials required to be shown are included, with black space provided to mark local commercial time.

Some universities, colleges and larger schools have the equipment available to receive these signals, as do a few individuals.  Some people record the preaired show onto their computers and upload it to the internet to allow people around the world early access. However, if any of the redistributed content is pre-recorded ("in a fixed medium" as described in the Copyright Act of 1976), this is a copyright violation; redistribution of fully live content exists in a legal gray area.  Most networks have switched to a digital feed which requires more expensive equipment and can also be encrypted if needed. This has reduced the availability of preair episodes appearing on the internet.

See also
 Backhaul (broadcasting)

External links
http://www.vidiot.com/Wildfeed.html

Television terminology